Lost Messengers: The Outtakes is the second EP by American metalcore band August Burns Red.  It was released on February 24, 2009, through Solid State Records, featuring B-sides and demos from their previous album, Messengers.

Track listing

Notes
"Carol of the Bells" was originally recorded for the X Christmas compilation and was used in select movie trailers for The Spirit, which was released Christmas Day, 2008. It was also included in the 2010 Christmas special for American Dad!.
"To Those About to Rock" is a parody of southern rock and southern metal music that was inspired by riffs played by the band for practice. 
"Mosely" was originally a bonus track from the vinyl edition of Messengers.

Personnel
August Burns Red
 Jake Luhrs – lead vocals
 JB Brubaker – lead guitar
 Brent Rambler – rhythm guitar
 Dustin Davidson – bass guitar, backing vocals
 Matt Greiner – drums, piano

References 

August Burns Red albums
2009 EPs
Solid State Records EPs